Miloš Bursać (born 23 June 1965) is a Serbian football striker who played for Yugoslavia and various clubs in former Yugoslavia and western Europe. One of the highlights of his career is scoring four goals for Sutjeska Nikšić on 25th August 1985 in the match against Velež Mostar.

Notes

References
 Profile on Serbian federation site
 
 Profile on BDFutbol

1965 births
Living people
Serbian footballers
Yugoslav footballers
Yugoslavia international footballers
Association football forwards
Yugoslav First League players
FK Zemun players
HNK Hajduk Split players
Red Star Belgrade footballers
Ligue 1 players
SC Toulon players
Olympique Lyonnais players
La Liga players
RC Celta de Vigo players
CA Marbella footballers
Belgian Pro League players
Royal Antwerp F.C. players
R.W.D. Molenbeek players
FK Sutjeska Nikšić players
Serbian expatriate footballers
Expatriate footballers in Belgium
Expatriate footballers in France
Expatriate footballers in Spain